Skakavac may refer to:

 Skakavac, Sarajevo, a waterfall near Sarajevo, Bosnia and Herzegovina
 Skakavac Waterfall (Mrkonjić Grad), a waterfall near Mrkonjić Grad, Bosnia and Herzegovina
 Skakavac, Foča, a waterfall in Perućica near Foča, Bosnia and Herzegovina
 Skakavac, Croatia, a village near Karlovac, Croatia
 Skakavac, Bosanski Petrovac, a village near Bosanski Petrovac, Bosnia and Herzegovina
 Skakavac, Berane Municipality, a village in Montenegro